Arangina is a genus of South Pacific cribellate araneomorph spiders in the family Dictynidae, and was first described by Pekka T. Lehtinen in 1967.  it contains only two species, both found in New Zealand: A. cornigera and A. pluva.

References

Araneomorphae genera
Dictynidae
Spiders of New Zealand
Taxa named by Pekka T. Lehtinen